Glionnetia is a monotypic genus of flowering plants in the family Rubiaceae. The genus contains only one species, viz. Glionnetia sericea, which is endemic to Mahé and Silhouette Island in the Seychelles. The species thrives mainly on high ridges in the mountains and it does not seem to grow well at lower altitudes. Glionnetia  sericea is a small flower with paniculate terminal inflorescences and it has capsules that are dispersed by wind.

References

Vanguerieae
Monotypic Rubiaceae genera
Flora of Seychelles
Taxonomy articles created by Polbot
Taxa named by John Gilbert Baker